The Last Princess is a 2016 South Korean period drama film directed by Hur Jin-ho with a screenplay by Hur, Lee Han-eol, and Seo Yoo-min, based on the best-selling novel by Kwon Bi-young. It stars Son Ye-jin as Princess Deokhye, the last princess of the Joseon Dynasty. The film depicts Princess Deokhye's life in Japan after she was forced to move there at age 13 by the Imperial Japanese government, and her attempts to return to Korea.

Plot
In 1925, Korea is ruled by Japan, and 13-year-old Princess Deokhye – the last princess of the Joseon Dynasty – is forced to move to Japan to attend school there. She misses her home, and after she finishes school she makes several attempts to return, but is prevented by pro-Japanese general Han Taek-soo. One day, she is reunited with her childhood friend, Kim Jang-han, an officer in the Japanese army who is also part of the Korean independence movement. Kim plans a secret operation to move Deokhye and her brother Yi Un to Shanghai, site of the Provisional Government of the Republic of Korea. This attempt fails after Han Taek-soo discovers the plan, and Deokhye and Kim are separated, losing contact with each other. She is forced to marry Count Sō Takeyuki in 1931, and develops schizophrenia after giving birth to their daughter the following year. Kim becomes a newspaper reporter and eventually finds Deokhye in a Japanese mental hospital, decades after they were separated. He then persuades the South Korean government to allow her in the country, and in 1962, Deokhye is finally able to return to her homeland.

Cast

 Son Ye-jin as Princess Deokhye
 Kim So-hyun as teen Deokhye
 Shin Rin-ah as young Deokhye
 Park Hae-il as Kim Jang-han
 Yeo Hoe-hyun as teen Jang-han
 Lee Hyo-je as young Jang-han
 Yoon Je-moon as Han Taek-soo
 Ra Mi-ran as Bok-soon
 Jung Sang-hoon as Bok-dong
 Park Joo-mi as Yang Gwi-in 
 Ahn Nae-sang as Kim Hwang-jin
 Kim Dae-myung as Kim Bong-guk
 Baek Yoon-sik as Emperor Gojong
 Park Soo-young as Yi Un
 Kim Jae-wook as Count Sō Takeyuki
 Go Soo as Yi Wu
 Oh Hye-won as Oh-hye
 Lee Chae-eun as Jung-hye
 Naho Toda as Yi Bang-ja
 Lee Se-na as Seo Kyung-shin
 Jung Se-hyung as Lee Gun
 Kim Seung-hoon as Chairman Park
 Do Yong-gu as Yoshida
 Ahn Sang-woo as Emperor Sunjong
 Kwak Ja-Hyoung as ID examiner for those boarding ship to Korea
 Nam Sang-ji as Orphanage schoolmistress
 Shin Shin-ae as Hangeul School Principal (Special Appearance)

Production
Director Hur Jin-ho decided to make a film about Princess Deokhye after watching a documentary about her on television; he could not forget the scene showing the princess reuniting with her court ladies at the Gimpo Airport, when she was finally allowed to return to Korea after 38 years in Japan. The film's screenplay was co-written by Hur, Lee Han-eol, and Seo Yoo-min, based on the best-selling novel Princess Deokhye (2009) by Kwon Bi-young. The story is a mix of fact and fiction, as Kim Jang-han is a fictional character. Princess Deokhye's story had never been made into a film before this.

At the 2012 Busan International Film Festival (BIFF), Hur's film project was selected to receive co-production development support from the Korean Film Council. Pre-production for The Last Princess began in 2014. In August 2015, Son Ye-jin and Park Hae-il were announced to be starring in the film. Son had previously worked with Hur on the 2005 film April Snow. The Last Princess was launched in October 2015 at BIFF's Asian Film Market. Principal photography commenced on 30 November and was completed on 23 March 2016, with filming taking place in Japan and South Korea. The film was initially funded with US$8.6 million, and Son invested  (US$886,500) into the film after production costs rose, so the staff would have a "more comfortable working environment".

Son accepted the role of Princess Deokhye with no hesitation. In an interview, she said "I know how hard it is to find a film that places such importance on a female character and deals with her life's journey...I have no hope that I'll come across another film like this for the rest of my career." However, she felt "tremendous pressure" portraying a historical figure, and it was her first time playing such a role. At a press conference, she said of the role: "The most difficult part about acting out Princess Deokhye was to think over and over what the princess would have done whenever I was confronted with the discrepancy between the existing archives and the film-adaptation version." After seeing the completed film, she said she had no regrets about her performance.

Reception

Box office
The Last Princess opened in third place at the box office on August 3, and rose to the number one spot during the weekend of August 5–7. Over the weekend, 1.2 million tickets were sold across 961 screens, accounting for 24 percent of all ticket sales in South Korea. The film earned US$12.4 million in a five-day period (August 3–7), with 1.7 million tickets sold. The film grossed US$35.4 million in South Korea. It grossed  worldwide.

Critical response
The film received generally positive reviews by critics. Sung So-young of the Korea JoongAng Daily praised the film for being "interesting enough to hold the audience's interest from beginning to end", even though she felt Hur's imagination went too far in several scenes. She said major events from Princess Deokhye's life were portrayed well, and the film's biggest virtue was how it made audiences want to know more about her. Woo Jae-yeon, writing for Yonhap, said the film confirms Hur's reputation as a director who "has a proven track record in weaving a love story from a delicate web of emotions that each character experiences". Woo also praised Son Ye-jin's "outstanding" performance for her portrayal of "the unfathomable depths of the emotional ups and downs of Deokhye."

Rumy Doo of The Korea Herald said the film was a "refreshing change from typical dramas about the Japanese occupation of Korea, which are usually intent on delivering a message of patriotism, and tend to be heavy-handed in their emotional arcs". Doo appreciated Hur's "muted approach" in his handling of the character's emotions, and praised the performances of the two leads, saying Park Hae-il showed "deft skill and subtlety" and Son Ye-jin proved herself a "sensitive and technically refined performer". Yun Suh-young of The Korea Times praised the film for being "engaging, entertaining and moving", rare for a historical film, and complemented Hur's "masterful" direction and the cast's "superb" acting.

Awards and nominations

References

External links 
 
 

2016 films
2016 biographical drama films
2016 drama films
2010s historical drama films
2010s Korean-language films
Films about royalty
Films about princesses
Films based on South Korean novels
Films directed by Hur Jin-ho
Films set in Korea under Japanese rule
Films set in the Korean Empire
Films set in Japan
Films shot in Japan
Films shot in South Korea
Japan in non-Japanese culture
Lotte Entertainment films
CJ Entertainment films
South Korean biographical drama films
South Korean epic films
South Korean historical drama films
2010s South Korean films